Žagarė (see also other names) is a city located in the Joniškis district, northern Lithuania, close to the border with Latvia. It has a population of about 2,000, down from 14,000 in 1914, when it was the 7th largest city in Lithuania. Žagarė is famous for Žagarvyšnė - a cherry species originated in Žagarė.

Etymology
Žagarė's name is probably derived from the Lithuanian word žagaras, meaning "twig".

History
The foundation of Žagarė dates back to the 12th century. A settlement of the Baltic tribe Semigallians Sagera was mentioned for the first time in March 1254 in the documents of the partitioning of the Semigallia. In 13th century it was a Semigalian fortress Raktuvė (or Raktė, first mentioned in 1272-1289 documents). It was an important centre of Semigallian warriors, who fought against the Livonian Brothers of the Sword and the Livonian Order. The cult of Barbora Žagarietė, servant of God, originated in the town in mid-1600s.

It long had a Jewish population that contributed to its culture. Yisroel Salanter (1810–1883), the father of the 19th-century Mussar movement in Orthodox Judaism, was born there. Isaak Kikoin (1908–1984), a renowned Soviet physicist, was also born there.

The Jewish quarter in Žagarė was among those damaged in 1881 as part of the violence against Jews that occurred during the pogroms in southern Russia.

On 22 August 1941, on the orders of Šiauliai Gebietskommissar Hans Gewecke, all half-Jews and Jews in the district were to be moved to Žagarė ghetto (around 500 people). The Jews were allowed only to take clothing and at most 200 Reichsmark. Many Jews were shot on the spot instead of being sent to the ghetto. In a massacre committed by Einsatzgruppe A on 2 October 1941, the date of Yom Kippur that year, all Jews were killed at the marketplace and buried in Naryshkin Park.

Today Žagarė is the administrative centre of the Žagarė Regional Park, known for its valuable urban and natural heritage. Once one of the largest cities in Lithuania (in the 1900s the number of city inhabitants exceeded 10 thousand), it preserved valuable urban complexes – trade square, side street network with early 20th century brick buildings, two churches, Žagarė manor with park, former early 20 c. cinema building and other valuable urban artefacts.

Notable residents
Marius Katiliškis, prominent Lithuanian exile novelist
 Juozas Žlabys-Žengė, Lithuanian poet
 Vaclovas Daunoras, prominent Lithuanian opera soloist.
Louis Bookman 
Sidney Hillman 
Isaak Kikoin 
Phoebus Levene
Paul Mandelstamm
Yisroel Salanter
Kalonimus Wolf Wissotzky.  Founder of Wissotzky Tea
Barbora Žagarietė
Sarah Millin, South African author

Twin towns – sister cities

Žagarė is a member of the Charter of European Rural Communities, a town twinning association across the European Union, alongside with:

 Bienvenida, Spain
 Bièvre, Belgium
 Bucine, Italy
 Cashel, Ireland
 Cissé, France
 Desborough, England, United Kingdom
 Esch, Netherlands
 Hepstedt, Germany
 Ibănești, Romania
 Kandava, Latvia
 Kannus, Finland
 Kolindros, Greece
 Lassee, Austria
 Medzev, Slovakia
 Moravče, Slovenia
 Næstved, Denmark
 Nagycenk, Hungary
 Nadur, Malta
 Ockelbo, Sweden
 Pano Lefkara, Cyprus
 Põlva, Estonia
 Samuel, Portugal
 Slivo Pole, Bulgaria
 Starý Poddvorov, Czech Republic
 Strzyżów, Poland
 Tisno, Croatia
 Troisvierges, Luxembourg

References

Further reading

 Rose Zwi: "Last Walk in Naryshkin Park" 1997  A Familie chronicle of her two families of origin Yoffe and Reisen. This account tells the story of Lithuanian Jews caught in the sweeping history of the first half of the century in Europe.

External links
Website about the city
Entry in JewishGen Database

 
Cities in Lithuania
Cities in Šiauliai County
Latvia–Lithuania border crossings
Duchy of Samogitia
Shavelsky Uyezd
Holocaust locations in Lithuania